Dorothy Lyndall (May 4, 1891 – May 11, 1979) was an American dancer and dance educator.

Early life 
Dorothy Stewart Lyndall was born in Los Angeles in 1891, the daughter of Charles Penny Lyndall and Deborah Stewart Lyndall. She attended the University of California, Los Angeles.

Career 
Lyndall was a dancer in Los Angeles, performing and touring in the 1910s as a leading member of the Norma Gould Dancers. Her frequent partner in dancing and teaching was dancer and model Bertha Wardell. She also had her own long-running school of dance in Los Angeles. Among her students in the 1930s were choreographer Myra Kinch and Yuriko Kikuchi, who later danced on Broadway and with Martha Graham. Another noted former student, Janet Collins, recalled Lyndall fondly: "Dorothy Lyndall was the greatest dance enthusiast and lover of the dance I have ever known. She loved the dance and loved dancers. She was literally a Socrates of the dance — she gathered dancers under her wings like a mother hen with her chicks." Adrienne Dore danced in 1931 programs directed by Lyndall. 

In 1935, Lyndall and Myra Kinch taught a special course in eurhythmics at the University of Arizona's dance program, which was under the direction of Lyndall's student Genevieve Brown Wright. Lyndall was still teaching and touring in 1948, when she went to Hawaii to study children's dance programs, and was described as being frequently in Tucson, Arizona. In 1951 she visited Genevieve Wright in Arizona.

Lyndall was a member of the Dancers' League. She also wrote poetry, some of which was published in The Lyric West.

Personal life 
Dorothy Lyndall and Margaret Rees traveled together in the American Southwest, Hawaii, and Mexico. Their collection of photographs and postcards is in the University of California, Irvine Libraries. Lyndall died in 1979, in Fontana, California, aged 88 years. Her grave is in Mission City Memorial Park in Santa Clara, California.

References

External links 

 John Crosse, "Bertha Wardell: Dances in Silence: Kings Road, Olive Hill and Carmel" Southern California Architectural History (June 4, 2012). A long and abundantly illustrated blogpost situating Dorothy Lyndall and Bertha Wardell in the Los Angeles arts scene of the 1910s and 1920s, including connections with dancers Ruth St. Denis, Ted Shawn, and Mikhail Mordkin, and photographers Barbara Morgan and Edward Weston.

1891 births
1979 deaths
American dancers
Dance education in the United States
People from Los Angeles
University of California, Los Angeles alumni